Pangalay (also known as Daling-Daling or Mengalai in Sabah)  is the traditional "fingernail" dance of the Tausūg people of the Sulu Archipelago and eastern coast Bajau of Sabah.

The dance has a similarity to classical Balinese and Thai dances, where it is also the most distinctively Asian of all the southern Philippine dances because dancers must have dexterity and flexibility of the shoulders, elbows, and wrists – movements that strongly resemble those of "kontaw silat". The Malaysian art of Buah Pukul is classified as silat despite its Yunnan origin, kuntao is "way of the fist", from kun 拳 meaning fist and tao 道 meaning way. This term was originally used for Chinese martial arts in general.  The Pangalay is predominantly performed during weddings or other festive events. The male equivalent of the Pangalay is the Pangasik and features more martial movements, while a pangalay that features both a male and female dancer is called Pangiluk.

The original concept of the Pangalay is based on the pre-Islamic and Buddhist concept of male and female celestial angels (Sanskrit: Vidhyadhari, Tausug: Biddadari) common as characters in other Southeast Asian dances.

Neighbouring Samal and Bajau peoples in the Philippines call this type of dance, Umaral or Igal, and they sometimes use bamboo castanets as substitutes for long fingernails.

Pakiring
A variant of the dance called Pakiring is practiced by the people of Mindanao, Sulu and Sabah. The dance emphasizes the movement of the hips (kiring-kiring), to mimic the movement of a butterfly. It is also called kendeng-kendeng in Tagalog speakers of Central Luzon.

Throughout the Philippines, a traditional song called Kiriring Pakiriring often accompanied this dance. The lyrics of the song is in the Sama language and are thought to have originated from Simunul, where the language is often spoken. The song became popular nationwide when it was re-recorded in the 90s under the title, Dayang Dayang; however some of lyrics have been changed and considered mainly to be largely gibberish since the altered words has no meaning behind them and were not related to any dialect or adage. The meaning of its name is lived to be referring to Hadji Dayang Dayang Piandao, the first lady of Sulu, since the word dalay-dalay was a title given only to the stepdaughters of the Sultan. Today, this version is widely known across the Philippines rather than the original but its origin and the artist who originally recorded it was sung by Hainun Pangilan.

See also
Tagonggo

References

External links
 Video of Tausug Pangalay performed by the Tambuli Cultural Dance Troupe of Tawi-Tawi
 Video of Bajau Igal performed in Semporna, Sabah
 Video of modern Pakiring (pangalay variant) performed by Hainun of Tawi-Tawi

Dances of the Philippines
Culture of Sulu
Dances of Malaysia